Tusmore Park can mean
Tusmore Park, a country estate in Oxfordshire, England
Tusmore Park, a public park in Adelaide, South Australia